Macrotoma is a genus of beetle belonging to the family Cerambycidae.

List of species
The following species are recognised in the genus Macrotoma:
 Macrotoma androyana Fairmaire, 1901
 Macrotoma castaneipennis Kolbe, 1894
 Macrotoma coelaspis White, 1853
 Macrotoma delahayei Bouyer, 2010
 Macrotoma drumonti Bouyer, 2011
 Macrotoma ducarmei Bouyer, 2016
 Macrotoma gerstaeckeri Lameere, 1903
 Macrotoma hassoni Bouyer, 2016
 Macrotoma hayesii (Hope, 1833)
 Macrotoma legalli Delahaye, 2015
 Macrotoma hayesii (Hope, 1833)
 Macrotoma mourgliai Bouyer, 2010
 Macrotoma natala (Thomson, 1860)
 Macrotoma palmata Fabricius, 1792
 Macrotoma prionopus White, 1853
 Macrotoma serripes (Fabricius, 1778)
 Macrotoma vandeweghei Bouyer, 2016

References
 Biolib

Prioninae